The 2015 Biathlon Junior World Championships was held in Raubichi-Minsk, Belarus from February 18 to February 24, 2015. There was a total of 16 competitions: sprint, pursuit, individual, and relay races for men and women.

Schedule
All times are local (UTC+3).

Medal winners

Youth Women

Junior Women

Youth Men

Junior Men

Medal table

References

External links
Official IBU website 

Biathlon Junior World Championships
2015 in biathlon
2015 in Belarusian sport
International sports competitions hosted by Belarus
2015 in youth sport
Sports competitions in Minsk